is a private junior college in Amagasaki, Hyogo, Japan. The Japan Iron and Steel Federation Corp considered it necessary to provide specialized training to engineers who would work in the iron and steel industry in 1962. It consists of four departments now. Moreover, it is one of the very few industry-specific junior colleges in Japan.

Department and Graduate Course

Departments 
 Department of system design engineering
 Department of Mechanical engineering
 Department of electric and Electronic Engineering
 Department of information processing engineering

Advanced courses 
 Department of Industrial engineering
 Department of electricity and information engineering

Available certifications 
 Students in the department of electrical and electronic engineering can earn professional certification as an electrician.

See also 
 List of junior colleges in Japan

External links

 College of Industrial Technology

Private universities and colleges in Japan
Japanese junior colleges
Universities and colleges in Hyōgo Prefecture
Amagasaki